Ryan McCollum (born March 4, 1998) is an American football center for the Pittsburgh Steelers of the National Football League (NFL). He played college football at Texas A&M.

College career
In August 2015, McCollum verbally committed to Oklahoma State. On December 2, 2015, he decommitted from Oklahoma State, and committed to Texas A&M on December 13, 2015. During his freshman year in 2017, he appeared in 13 games, with seven starts. During his sophomore year in 2018, he appeared in 12 games with seven starts. During his junior year in 2019, he appeared in eight games, and was awarded the Offensive Unselfish Leadership Award at the annual team banquet. 

During his senior year in 2020, he served as the offensive team captain in five games. He was named the Southeastern Conference Offensive Lineman of the Week for the week ending December 7, 2020. On January 6, 2021, he declared for the 2021 NFL Draft.

Professional career

Houston Texans
On May 14, 2021, the Houston Texans signed McCollum as an undrafted college free agent.

Detroit Lions
On October 6, 2021, the Detroit Lions signed McCollum off the Texans' practice squad. 

On March 10, 2022, McCollum re-signed with the Lions. On August 15, the Lions waived McCollum.

Pittsburgh Steelers
On August 16, 2022, the Pittsburgh Steelers claimed McCollum off waivers from Detroit. He was waived on August 30 and signed to the practice squad the next day. He signed a reserve/future contract on January 10, 2023.

Personal life
On September 15, 2018, McCollum was arrested for reckless driving and evading a campus police officer; however, all of the charges were eventually dropped.

References

External links
Detroit Lions bio

1998 births
Living people
American football centers
American football offensive guards
Detroit Lions players
Houston Texans players
People from Spring, Texas
Players of American football from Texas
Texas A&M Aggies football players